James Kelso (8 December 1910 – 13 March 1987) was a Scottish footballer who played as a defender for Helensburgh, Dumbarton, Bradford Park Avenue, Port Vale, Newport County, Cardiff City, Swindon Town, and Ebbw Vale.

Career
Kelso played for Helensburgh, Dumbarton and Bradford (Park Avenue) before joining Port Vale in June 1934. He made his debut in a 4–1 win over Southampton at The Old Recreation Ground on 3 September 1934 and started the next nine Second Division games, but lost his place to Ernest Breeze in November 1934 and rarely featured in the rest of the 1934–35 season. He was given a free transfer in May 1935 and moved on to Welsh club Newport County, who struggled in the lower half of the Third Division South table in 1935–36, 1936–37, and 1937–38. He then left Rodney Parade for league rivals Cardiff City, and made 41 league appearances at Ninian Park in 1938–39. During World War II he guested for Bristol City, Bath City, Liverpool and Swansea Town. He later played for Swindon Town and Ebbw Vale, before becoming a scout at Blackpool.

Career statistics
Source:

References

1910 births
1987 deaths
Footballers from Renfrewshire
Scottish footballers
Association football defenders
Helensburgh F.C. players
Dumbarton F.C. players
Bradford (Park Avenue) A.F.C. players
Port Vale F.C. players
Newport County A.F.C. players
Cardiff City F.C. players
Bristol City F.C. wartime guest players
Liverpool F.C. wartime guest players
Swansea Town A.F.C. wartime guest players
Swindon Town F.C. players
Ebbw Vale F.C. players
Scottish Football League players
English Football League players
Association football scouts
Blackpool F.C. non-playing staff